The following is a list of current (as of the 2023 season) Major League Baseball broadcasters for each individual team. Some franchises have a regular color commentator while others (such as the Milwaukee Brewers) use two play-by-play announcers, with the primary often doing more innings than the secondary. Secondary play-by-play announcers are noted by bold and the number of innings of play-by-play are listed in "Radio Broadcaster Inning Formats".

In pay television, 14 teams broadcast on Bally Sports affiliates, four on NBC Sports Regional Networks affiliates and four on AT&T SportsNet affiliates. Meanwhile, the New York Mets are broadcast on SportsNet New York; the New York Yankees are on YES Network; the Los Angeles Dodgers are on Spectrum SportsNet LA; the Chicago Cubs are on Marquee Sports Network; the Baltimore Orioles and the Washington Nationals are on MASN and MASN2; the Boston Red Sox are on NESN; and the Toronto Blue Jays are on Sportsnet.

Regional broadcasters

American League

National League

Radio broadcaster inning formats

Under the broadcasters list above, in the secondary play-by-play/color analyst column, the secondary play-by-play broadcaster is bolded if they also do play-by-play (all of which are on radio). Identified below are which innings those broadcasters do play-by-play (including extra innings in bold, if applicable).

American League
Baltimore: Innings 3–4, 6-7, and even extra innings
Boston: Innings 3–4, 6-7, and even extra innings
Chicago White Sox: Innings 4-5 (with Jackson)
Cleveland: Innings 4-5
Houston: Innings 3–4, and 7
Kansas City: Innings 3–4, 6–7, and even extra innings
Minnesota: Innings 4–6, and odd extra innings
Oakland: Innings 3–4, 7, and even extra innings
Seattle: Innings 3, 6–7, and even extra innings
Tampa Bay: Innings 3–4, 7–8, and even extra innings (Wills and Freed switched every game so the next game, that broadcaster would do play-by-play in innings 3–4, 7–8, and even extra innings).
Texas: Innings 3–4, 7, and even extra innings

National League
Atlanta: Innings 4–6, and odd extra innings when Powell works with Simpson; Innings 3–4, 6–7, and odd extra innings when Ingram works with Simpson.
Chicago Cubs: Inning 5; innings 3–4, 7 (for spring training games broadcast on MLB.com)
Cincinnati: Innings 3–4, 7 and even extra innings 
Colorado: Innings 2–3, 6–7, and even extra innings 
Milwaukee: Innings 3–4, 7, and 10-11, 14–15, 18-19 with Uecker and Grindle; innings 4–6, and 10-11, 14–15, 18-19 with Levering and Grindle 
New York Mets: Innings 3–4, 7, and even extra innings 
Philadelphia: Innings 4-5 (home games only) 
St. Louis: Innings 3–4, 7, and even extra innings 
San Francisco: Innings 3–4, 7, and even extra innings 
Washington: Innings 3–4, 6–7, and even extra innings

National broadcasters

Television broadcasters

Regular season

All-Star Game and postseason

Radio broadcasters

Regular season and the All-Star Game

Postseason

International broadcasters

Africa

Americas

Asia

Europe

Middle East and North Africa

Oceania

All-Star Game and postseason

See also
 MLB Network
 MLB.tv
 Major League Baseball on television
 List of current Major League Soccer broadcasters
 List of current National Basketball Association broadcasters
 List of current National Football League broadcasters
 List of current National Hockey League broadcasters

Notes
 Some Cincinnati Reds games also air on Bally Sports Indiana, Bally Sports South, and Bally Sports Southeast  (channel varies by region).
 Some St. Louis Cardinals games are also available on Bally Sports Indiana, Bally Sports South, and Bally Sports Southeast (channel varies by region).
  If Jon Miller of the Giants is off, Duane Kuiper will work the first 3 and last 3 innings on TV while Dave Flemming does the middle 3 innings on TV. On radio, Flemming does the first 3 and last 3 innings of play-by-play on radio and Kuiper does the middle 3 innings on radio.
  If Kuiper is off, Flemming will do the first 3 and last 3 innings on TV, with Miller doing the middle 3 innings on TV. Miller also does the first and last 3 innings on radio and Flemming does the middle 3 innings.
  If Flemming is off, Kuiper does TV for the first and last 3 innings and the middle 3 on radio. Miller does the first and last 3 innings on radio while doing the middle 3 on TV.
  Joe Ritzo fills in on radio if 2/3 of the Giants primary play by play announcers are off.
  Dan Shulman assumes the role of primary play by play for 2022.

References

External links

 
 
 
MLB
Major League Baseball announcers